Cancer bellianus, the toothed rock crab, is a common species of crab in the north-eastern Atlantic Ocean.

Description

Distribution and ecology
Its geographical range extends from near Höfn on the south coast of Iceland (at nearly 64° N) south to Morocco, including the Azores, Madeira and the Canary Islands. While the species is sometimes abundant in the south of its range, it is uncommon further north; all the specimens from Brittany and further north were male, and are thought to be recent travellers from further south, rather than representing a stable northern population.

Fisheries
C. bellianus is caught as bycatch by artisan fishermen targeting Palinurus elephas, and as much as 10 t can be caught annually.

References

Cancroidea
Edible crustaceans
Crustaceans of the Atlantic Ocean
Crustaceans described in 1861